The 1953 NCAA Men's Tennis Championships were the 8th annual tournaments to determine the singles, doubles, and team national champions of NCAA Division I men's collegiate tennis.

This year's tournaments were played in Syracuse, New York, hosted by Syracuse University, from June 22–27, 1953.

The tournament was directed by Syracuse athletic director Milton R. Howard, and the official referee was Perry Rockafellow, the tennis coach from Colgate. 

A total of 72 teams entered in the singles tournament and 30 teams joined the doubles bracket, representing a total of 31 universities.

Team scoring
Scoring: Quarterfinals (1 point), Semifinals (2), Runners-up (3), Championship (4)

Singles tournament
72 players, 31 universities

Doubles tournament
 30 total teams, 31 universities

References

External links
List of NCAA Men's Tennis Champions

NCAA Division I tennis championships
NCAA Division I Tennis Championships
NCAA Division I Tennis Championships